Profilin-1 is a protein that in humans is encoded by the PFN1 gene.

Function 

The protein encoded by this gene is a ubiquitous actin monomer-binding protein belonging to the profilin family. It is thought to regulate actin polymerization in response to extracellular signals. Deletion of this gene is associated with Miller-Dieker syndrome. Mutations in this gene may be a rare cause of amyotrophic lateral sclerosis, also called Lou Gehrig's disease.

Interactions 

Profilin 1 has been shown to interact with:
 FMNL1, 
 MLLT4 
 Vasodilator-stimulated phosphoprotein,
 WASF1,  and
 WASL.

References

Further reading